Heidi I. Hartmann is an American feminist economist who is founder and president emerita of the Washington-based Institute for Women's Policy Research (IWPR), a research organization created to conduct women-centered, public policy research. She retired from her position as President and CEO in 2019. 

Hartmann is an expert on the intersection of women, economics and public policy. Dr. Hartmann is also a Distinguished Economist in Residence at American University, a nonresident fellow at the Urban Institute, a research fellow at the Institute for Economic Equity at the Federal Reserve Bank of St. Louis, and editor of the Journal of Women, Politics & Policy.

Early life 
On August 14, 1945, Hartmann was born to Henry Hartmann and Hedwig (Bercher) Hartmann in Elizabeth, New Jersey. She attended Swarthmore College, where she received a B.A. in economics with honors in 1967. Hartmann then attended Yale University, where she received a M. Phil. in economics in 1972 and a PhD in the subject in 1974.

Awards and honors 
Hartmann has won various awards. In 1994, she won the MacArthur Fellowship Award—a five-year grant from the MacArthur Foundation give to individuals who show exceptional creativity for their research and the prospect for more in the future—for her work on women and economics. She is also the recipient of two honorary degrees.

Personal life 
In 1967, she married Frank Blair Cochran, birthed Jessica Lee Cochran then divorced a year later. In 1979, she married John Varick Wells and had two daughters—Katherine Lina Hartman Wells and Laura Cameron Hartmann Wells.

Selected bibliography 

Thesis
 

Books
  
  Assembly of Behavioral and Social Sciences (U.S.). Committee on Occupational Classification and Analysis.
 
 
 
 
 
 

Book chapters
  
 
 
 
 
 
 
 
 
 
 
 
 

Journal articles
 
 
  Pdf.
 
  Pdf.
 
  Pdf.
 
  Pdf.
 
  Pdf.
 
 
See also: 
See also: 
  Pdf.
 
 
 
 
 
 
 
 
 
 
 
 
 
 
 
 
 
 
 

Institute for Women's Policy Research

 Current papers.

See also 
 Feminist economics
 List of feminist economists

References

Further reading

External links
IWPR's Web site

1945 births
Feminist economists
Feminist studies scholars
Living people
MacArthur Fellows
People from New Jersey
Yale University alumni